Francis Boynton (1677 – 1739) was an English landowner and MP.

Francis Boynton may also refer to:

Sir Francis Boynton, 2nd Baronet (1618–1695) of the Boynton baronets
Sir Francis Boynton, 8th Baronet (1777–1832) of the Boynton baronets

See also
Boynton (disambiguation)